Mußbach, in the local dialect Muschbach, was instituted as a city district of Neustadt an der Weinstraße in 1969 by the Rhineland-Palatinate regional reforms. In 1935 it received the oeconym 'on the Weinstraße' due to its wine-growing status. Since its institution the number of residents has grown to around 4000, making it the third most populous district of Neustadt. First mention of the locality as Muosbach is found in the inventories of the Abbey of Fulda from around 780.

References 

Neustadt an der Weinstraße